Dal Bello may refer to:
Dalbello (Lisa Dal Bello; born 1959), musician
Mattia Dal Bello (1984–2004), Italian footballer